The Barrière River (French: Rivière Barrière) is a tributary of the Quinze Lake (Témiscamingue), flowing in the municipality of Rémigny, Quebec, in the Regional County Municipality (MRC ) of Temiscamingue, in the Abitibi-Témiscamingue administrative region, Quebec, Canada.

Recreational tourism activities are the main economic activity of the sector; agriculture, second.

Annually, the surface of the river is generally frozen from mid-November to late April, however, the period of safe ice circulation is usually from mid-December to early April.

Geography 
The hydrographic slopes near the Barrière River are:
North side: Rémigny Lake, Barrier Lake;
East side: Quinze Lake (Temiscamingue) (Tigre Bay), Lac Lebret, Beaumesnil Lake;
South side: Quinze Lake (Temiscamingue) (Barrière Bay), Ottawa River;
West side: Prévost Lake, Wright Creek, Burwash Creek.

The Barriere River has its source on the south shore of Rémigny Lake in the southern part of the town of Rémigny.

From its source, the Barrière River flows over  according to the following segments:
 Southeast passing the west side of the village of Rémigny, Quebec to the bridge over the Barrière River;
 Northeast from the west side of the village to its mouth.

The Barrière River flows on the North shore of the Quinze Lake (Témiscamingue). This mouth is located at:
 Southeast of the mouth of the Barriere Lake;
 South of the bridge over the Barrière River to the village of Rémigny, Quebec;
North of the mouth of the Quinze Lake;
 Northeast of Timiskaming Lake.

Toponymy 
The term "Barrière" is a family name of French origin.

The toponym "Barrière River" was formalized on December 5, 1968, at the Commission de toponymie du Québec, i.e. at the creation of the Commission.

See also 
Ottawa River, a watercourse
Quinze Lake (Témiscamingue), a lake
Rémigny Lake, a body of water
Rémigny, Quebec, a city
List of rivers of Quebec

References

External links 

Rivers of Abitibi-Témiscamingue